Operation Kugelblitz ("ball lightning") was a major anti-Partisan offensive orchestrated by German forces in December 1943 during World War II in Yugoslavia. The Germans attacked Josip Broz Tito's Partisan forces in the eastern parts of the Independent State of Croatia in an attempt to encircle and destroy them, thereby preventing the Partisans from entering the Territory of the Military Commander in Serbia. Operation Kugelblitz was followed up immediately by Operation Schneesturm (Blizzard) which sought to capitalise on the initial success of Operation Kugelblitz. Both operations are associated with the Sixth Enemy Offensive in Yugoslav historiography.

The offensive

Operation Kugelblitz
Operation Kugelblitz, the first of the two offensives, was executed by the 5th SS Mountain Corps. The aim of this operation was to dismantle and consequently destroy Partisan units in eastern Bosnia. The operation ultimately was unsuccessful because the German forces were unable to completely destroy all the Partisan troops. Because of the terrain, large area, and lack of Axis manpower to adequately cover the encirclement, Partisan forces evaded complete destruction by slipping through large gaps in the narrowing encirclement. However, the partisans still suffered severe casualties.

Operation Schneesturm
Operation Schneesturm was initiated immediately upon the completion of Operation Kugelblitz. This operation included twin drives from the Bosnia area. One drive headed westwards towards the Adriatic Sea. The other headed to the northwest and towards the border with Italy. While this operation ended late in December and the Partisans once again survived, the cost was high. The Partisans suffered about 2,000 additional casualties. Although badly battered, the majority of the Partisan units retained their cohesion. Tito's army, in the opinion of some, could still be considered an effective fighting force.

Results

References

Sources

See also
 Military history of Bulgaria during World War II
 Seven anti-Partisan offensives
 Resistance during World War II
 Anti-partisan operations in World War II

Seven Enemy Offensives
Battles and operations of World War II
Yugoslavia in World War II
Anti-partisan operations of World War II
Military operations of World War II involving Germany
Military operations of World War II involving Bulgaria
Battles involving the Yugoslav Partisans
1943 in Yugoslavia
1944 in Yugoslavia
Conflicts in 1943
Conflicts in 1944